Rasim Kalakula was an Albanian politician and mayor of Tirana from 1928 through 1930.

References

Year of birth missing
Year of death missing
Mayors of Tirana
Mekteb-i Mülkiye alumni